is a Flemish Baroque music ensemble founded in 1988 by oboist Marcel Ponseele and flutist . The name was derived from a piece by Vivaldi named after the goldfinch ( in Italian). The ensemble plays on period instruments in historically informed performances. The ensemble focus on works by Johann Sebastian Bach and his contemporaries Johann Friedrich Fasch, Carl Heinrich Graun, Handel, Johann Gottlieb Janitsch, Telemann and Vivaldi.

The group performed at the 2013 Festival of Flanders and the 2015 Bucharest Early Music Festival.

See also
 Ryo Terakado

References

External links 
 
 Il Gardellino Allmusic
 Il Gardellino (Instrumental Ensemble) Bach-Cantatas
 Il Gardellino (French) itinerairebaroque.com

Belgian classical music groups
Musical groups established in 1988